Jovana Gjorjioska (born 10 December 2000) is a Macedonian footballer who plays as a defender for 1. liga club ŽFK Despina Prilep and the North Macedonia women's national team.

References

2000 births
Living people
Women's association football defenders
Macedonian women's footballers
North Macedonia women's international footballers